The Great Adventure, also known as Her Great Adventure and Spring of the Year, is a 1918 American silent comedy-drama film directed by Alice Guy-Blaché, and starring Bessie Love.

The film is preserved at the BFI National Archive.

Production 
The film was made at Solax Studios in Fort Lee, New Jersey.

Plot 

Rags (Love), has found local success and acclaim in her small town as an actress, but dreams of stardom on Broadway. She and her aunt (Finch) go to New York, where she unsuccessfully looks for work in a Broadway chorus. On the advice of Billy Blake (Barnett), she holds up the producer of a Broadway show to get a job. The lead actor in the show, Sheen (Hall), likes Rags, but on a date together, he cannot ride a horse, paddle a canoe, or swim. Embarrassed, he leaves the Broadway show, allowing Billy to take over the male lead, and Rags to take over the female lead.

Cast 

 Bessie Love as Ragna "Rags" Jansen
 Flora Finch as Aunt
 Chester Barnett as Billy Blake
 Donald Hall as Sheen
 Florence Short as Hazel Lee
 Walter Craven
 Jack Dunn

Reception 

Love received good reviews for her performance, called "likable", but the film itself did not. It was said that the plot "stretches the imagination of the spectator," with another blaming director Guy-Blaché directly for poorly adapting the source material. Despite the critical reception, the film was commercially successful.

Re-release 
In 1922, the film was edited down to 3 reels, and released as a "Pathé Playlet".

References 
Citations

Works cited

External links 

 
 
 
 
 
 Press materials with imagery from the film

1918 comedy-drama films
American black-and-white films
American silent feature films
1910s English-language films
Films about theatre
Films based on short fiction
Films set in Manhattan
Pathé Exchange films
Surviving American silent films
1918 films
1910s American films
1920s American films
Silent American comedy-drama films